Pantomorus is a genus of broad-nosed weevils in the beetle family Curculionidae. There are more than 40 described species in Pantomorus.

Species
These 44 species belong to the genus Pantomorus:

 Pantomorus albicans Sharp, 1891
 Pantomorus albosignatus Boheman, 1840
 Pantomorus annectens Sharp, 1891
 Pantomorus asperatus Sharp, 1891
 Pantomorus biseriatus Hustache, 1947
 Pantomorus brevipes Sharp, 1891
 Pantomorus cervinus
 Pantomorus circumcinctus Sharp, 1891
 Pantomorus comes Kuschel, 1956
 Pantomorus crinitus Boheman, 1840
 Pantomorus distans Sharp, 1891
 Pantomorus dorsalis Sharp, 1891
 Pantomorus elegans (Horn, 1876)
 Pantomorus faber Sharp, 1891
 Pantomorus facialis Sharp, 1891
 Pantomorus femoratus Sharp, 1891
 Pantomorus globicollis (Pascoe, 1886)
 Pantomorus hovidus Champion, 1911
 Pantomorus humilis
 Pantomorus inimicus Marshall, 1938
 Pantomorus longulus Sharp, 1891
 Pantomorus maculosus Boheman, 1840
 Pantomorus mollis Sharp, 1891
 Pantomorus nobilis Boheman, 1840
 Pantomorus pallidus
 Pantomorus parvulus Sharp, 1891
 Pantomorus picipes Sharp, 1891
 Pantomorus picturatus Sharp, 1891
 Pantomorus postfasciatus
 Pantomorus rudis Sharp, 1891
 Pantomorus rufipes Sharp, 1891
 Pantomorus ruizi Cortés, 1942
 Pantomorus salvadorensis Kuschel, 1956
 Pantomorus salvini Sharp, 1891
 Pantomorus sobrinus Sharp, 1891
 Pantomorus strabo Sharp, 1891
 Pantomorus stupidus Boheman, 1840
 Pantomorus subcinctus Sharp, 1891
 Pantomorus sulfureus Champion, 1911
 Pantomorus tesselatus
 Pantomorus trituberculatus Champion, 1911
 Pantomorus uniformis Sharp, 1891
 Pantomorus viridicans Sharp, 1891
 Pantomorus viridisquamosus Dalla Torre & van Emden, 1936

References

Further reading

 
 
 
 

Weevils